Hrag Varoujan Yedalian (born December 14, 1981 in Los Angeles County, California) is an Armenian-American political consultant and documentary film director and producer. He is a graduate of the University of California, Berkeley and holds a Masters of Public Administration degree from the University of Southern California. He has attended UCLA School of Law and studied film editing at the AFI Conservatory. Hrag runs the Los Angeles-based consulting firm Blue State Campaigns. His work has been featured in Rolling Stone, The Hollywood Reporter, and San Francisco Chronicle. He previously worked at Steven Spielberg’s organization, the USC Shoah Foundation.

Filmography
Advantage Player (2023)
Animus (2023)
Dead Connection (2023)
Amber (Music Video) Serj Tankian featuring Sevak Amroyan (2022)
In Search of Boozers and Schmucks (Documentary Short) (2022)
System of A Down (Music Video Behind the Scenes) Protect the Land (2020)
Karabian: A Glimpse Into a Statesman's Life (2018)
The Ballerino (2011)
Dr. J. Michael Hagopian Tribute (2010)
The People's Advocate: The Life and Times of Charles R. Garry, about radical attorney Charles Garry (2007)
''Cowboys and Indians (Short film) as an editor

Awards
 Winner of Arpa Foundation for Film, Music and Art’s Best Documentary Film at the Arpa International Film Festival
 Mediamaker Award Winner at the 2007 BAVC (Bay Area Video Coalition) Awards
 Official Selection at the Mill Valley Film Festival
 Official Selection at the Ann Arbor Film Festival
 Official Selection at the San Francisco International Documentary Festival

References

External links
 Official website of Hrag Yedalian
 
 Blue State Campaigns website

1981 births
American people of Armenian descent
American documentary film directors
University of California, Berkeley alumni
Living people
UCLA School of Law alumni